Children's BBC Presentation was the BBC's presentation of its programmes for children and which was the only part of BBC One and BBC Two's television presentation where the continuity announcer appeared on the TV screen rather than as a voice over.

The services for children on BBC One and BBC Two (apart from on BBC Two on Saturday mornings) have now ended but similar presentation now takes place on the CBeebies and CBBC channels.

History 
In-vision presentation is old as the first children's programme on the BBC which began on Saturday 24 April 1937. For the Children would go on to be most famously presented live by Annette Mills with her sidekick Muffin the Mule. These early shows were live performances but as the television service became more sophisticated, with the development of pre-recorded programmes and series, children's programmes went on to be introduced by the offscreen continuity announcer announcing the next programme from a small continuity booth with the usual BBC1 or BBC2 branding appearing on screen although some special branding was put in use to reflect better the audience they were serving.

In 1984, a BBC Micro B 3D Collage was introduced to generate computer generated stings for the children's strand. Such animations were used to introduce programme, such as a spider spinning down onto a detonator triggering the words Hello from BBC1, and to link into promotions for further programmes, such as a group of sky divers falling from a plane to spell out a 'Later' caption. However, despite the graphics, programmes were still directly introduced by the BBC1 globe symbol, albeit occasionally accompanied by a choice of two different 14-note synthesized tunes.

In September 1985 a BBC press release announced the arrival of, "a new package of programmes specially gift-wrapped for children." This involved the afternoon programmes on BBC1 being rebranded as Children's BBC,  along with the continuity announcer appearing on screen (in-vision). Rather than use the existing BBC1 announcer, a new presenter was selected. The launch presenter was Phillip Schofield, presenting the slot for the first time at 15:55 BST on 9 September 1985.

It was not until 1994 that presentation for children's programming got its own studio space.

In 2002 programmes, when BBC Children's divided its services into CBBC and CBeebies, programmes for younger children were rebranded under the name CBeebies and the same production department began CBeebies Presentation.

Studios 
1985 - 1994

From its launch in 1985 until 1994, Children's BBC was presented from the regular continuity announcer's booth in the BBC1 network control area (NC1), which had a fixed camera so that the presenter could appear in vision; as it remained an operational continuity booth, the presenter would partly direct their own links by way of vision and sound mixers built into the studio desk.

The NC1 booth became known as 'the Broom Cupboard' due to its small size (the term was first used to refer to a smaller temporary booth, but was later retroactively applied to the main booth). The plain booth wall behind the presenter would be livened up with elements of set dressing, VT monitors and pictures sent in by viewers.

Occasionally, when Children's BBC was going out on BBC2 rather than BBC1 due to events coverage, the presenter would be located in the BBC2 continuity booth, which was not set dressed for Children's BBC, for transmission purposes.

There were two presentation studios – larger than the Broom Cupboards but smaller than full programme studios – known as Pres A and Pres B. It was not initially thought economically viable to use these for daily Children's BBC links, hence the use of the Broom Cupboard. However, by 1987 these studios were being used for the mid-morning 'birthday card' slots and weekend and holiday morning strands such as But First This. The main afternoon strand remained in the Broom Cupboard.

In 1994, Pres A was refurbished and became the regular home for all Children's BBC presentation including the weekday afternoon block; the presenters no longer had to operate the broadcast equipment, although a broom cupboard-style area in the corner of Pres A containing its own mixer was used for the birthday slot and weekend mornings to save on crew, and the larger set allowed for more dynamic presentation, with more presenters, characters, features, games and guests. A new 3D version of the then logo of Children's BBC was commissioned to mark the move.

1997 TC9

In 1997, Children's BBC moved again when 'Pres A' was decommissioned and CBBC moved to the purpose-built Studio TC9, adjacent to the Blue Peter garden at BBC Television Centre. The first broadcasts from Studio 9 were in June 1997 and this was followed in October by the launch of the new-look CBBC branding. TC9 continued to be the regular home of CBBC broadcasts on BBC One and Two until 2005 and was also used to record CBBC on Choice links between 2000 and 2002.

In 2002, TC2 became the home of CBBC Channel links, plus the channel's XChange and UK Top 40 programmes, whilst CBeebies operated from the smaller TC0.

In Autumn 2004, the studio arrangements for CBBC were changed again. The CBBC Channel moved from TC2 to TC9, with BBC One / Two links and the UK Top 40 show moving to TC1, located on the sixth floor of TV Centre. BBC One and Two links then moved back into TC9 alongside CBBC Channel in March 2006 as the number of studios available to CBBC was reduced.

In December 2006, there was a further reduction in CBBC facilities. A chroma key set was assembled in TC12, becoming the home of all CBBC links on BBC One, BBC Two and CBBC Channel until September 2007. There was also a reduction in the team of on air presenters. The last live CBBC links from TC9 were broadcast on Friday 1 December 2006; the studio was then mothballed but was later brought back into use for individual programmes including TMi and SMart.

2007 TC12

On 3 September 2007, the CSO studio was dropped in a relaunch which saw a small studio set built in TC12. As part of the relaunch, new logos, presenters and idents were introduced. The design of the new 'office' set has been compared to the original 'broom cupboard', though unlike the 'broom cupboard' the 'office' is not a functioning continuity suite.

2011 HQ5

CBBC presentation originated from Studio HQ5 at Dock10, MediaCityUK in Salford Quays for the first time on Monday 5 September 2011 as part of the relocation of the BBC's Children's department (incorporating both CBBC and CBeebies).

In 2015, the CBBC Office set received a new futuristic look, with much darker colours and tones, the light and dark greens colours replaced with purple and dark grey. Also, a new 'up next' screen was placed behind the presenter, and a post chute was installed in the new set where viewers send post to get read out live on air. There was also a new desk, larger than the previous one with multi-coloured blocks on its front.

In 2016, the CBBC Office became the CBBC HQ, incorporating a mostly orange and blue colour scheme, but later it changed to cyan and blue in 2023.

Nations Opt-Out 
In the 1990s, BBC Scotland introduced Children's BBC Scotland with a mixture of repeats and local programming such as Megamag and Up for It! which was broadcast in the school holidays on BBC One Scotland and then subsequently on BBC Two Scotland. During this time, BBC Scotland opt out of the national presenters to broadcast their local version of the weekday morning breakfast show presented by Grant Stott and Gail Porter.

Logos and idents

References

External links 

 The Broom Cupboard.co.uk, a history of CBBC continuity from 1985 to 1992, with over 150 pictures

BBC Television
BBC Idents
Children's television
Television presentation in the United Kingdom